SM Haroon-or-Rashid (known as Harun Rashid; born 1962) is a Bangladeshi journalist and dramatist. He is the current Director General of Bangladesh Television since 14 January 2016. He won Bangladesh National Film Award for Best Dialogue for the film Putro (2018).

Education
Rashid completed his bachelor's and master's in mass communication and journalism from the University of Dhaka.

References

Living people
1962 births
University of Dhaka alumni
Bangladeshi journalists
Bangladeshi dramatists and playwrights
Best Dialogue National Film Award (Bangladesh) winners
Date of birth missing (living people)
People from Sirajganj District